Michael E. Davis (born August 15, 1946) is an American politician.

Davis was born in Massena, Iowa, on August 15, 1946. He was raised in California, where he attended University High School. Upon graduation in 1964, Davis enrolled at Grossmont College. He earned an associate degree in 1966, followed by a bachelor's degree in economics at the University of San Diego in 1968. In 1978, Davis completed a Master of Arts in Teaching at the University of Alaska Fairbanks. He was elected to four terms as a member of the Alaska House of Representatives from District 19, serving between 1982 and 1990, as a Democrat. Davis's tenure at the University of Alaska Fairbanks overlapped with his legislative service. He formally joined the UAF faculty in 1996, and continued teaching after he was granted emeritus status in 2014.

References

1946 births
Living people
20th-century American politicians
University of San Diego alumni
University of Alaska Fairbanks alumni
Grossmont College alumni
University of Alaska Fairbanks faculty
Democratic Party members of the Alaska House of Representatives
People from Cass County, Iowa